Gardaneh may refer to:

Gardaneh Taqa
Gardaneh-ye Bastak
Gardaneh-ye Firuzabad
Gardaneh-ye Godar Arbu
Gardaneh-ye Hameh Kasi
Gardaneh-ye Jenjan
Gardaneh-ye Kol Hasank
Gardaneh-ye Mo'allem Khani
Gardaneh-ye Poshtkuh
Gardaneh-ye Robat Sefid
Gardaneh-ye Shebli